Early parliamentary elections were held in Austria on 10 October 1971, following electoral reforms intended to benefit smaller parties. The number of seats in the National Council was increased from 165 to 183, and the proportionality of the seat distribution was increased as well.

The Socialist Party, which had governed as a minority government since 1970, won 93 of the 183 seats, a majority of two. Voter turnout was 92.4%. It was the first time that the Socialists had won an absolute majority at an election. They also won just over half of the vote, something no Austrian party had previously achieved in a free election. Socialist leader Bruno Kreisky remained Chancellor.

Results

References

Elections in Austria
Austria
Legislative
Austria